Mohammadreza Solati (born 9 June 1975 in Mashhad) is an Iranian actor and voice actor

He became a famous voice in Iran by dubbing the animated character SpongeBob.

Career 
Solati started dubbing in 2004. After a while, he joined the "Young Speakers Association" and seriously pursued the narration of animation works.
Solati is one of the speakers who has the ability to speak. In the animation Shark Tale, he has typed three main characters (Lenny, Ernie, Bernie) and four sub-characters.

Dubbing

Dubbing in Iran 

Jumanji: Welcome to the Jungle

Cars (Mater (Cars))
The Lion King (timon)
SpongeBob SquarePants (SpongeBob SquarePants, Patrick Star, Squidward Tentacles, Eugene Krabs)
Toy Story (Woody)
Ice Age (franchise) (Sid)
Joker (joker)
Big Hero 6 (police and wasabi)
 Sniper: Ghost Shooter
 Tom and Jerry meet Sherlock (Holmes Sherlock Holmes)
 The brave Batman of the wild (cat, Mr. Ghost)
 Batman: The Brave and the Bold (Tom Kenny, Kevin Michael Richardson)
 Timon and Pumba (Timon Dubbing Manager)
 Phoenix and Farb (Daphne Schmidt)
 Batman (animated series) The (Joker and the Penguin Kevin Michael Richardson and Tom Tom Kenny)
 Supergirl (TV series)
 Batman: The Animated Series(Joker and Penguin)
 The devil all the time (movie)
 Hacker Dubbing director
 Mulan
 Hell Boy (Movie 2019) Dubbing Director
 Scooby (Scooby)
 Capture series
 Grinch (movie) (Grinch character)
 Split (2016 movie)
 Daltons (atmosphere)
 Doolittle (movie) (Doolittle character)
 Operation Nuts Dubbing Manager
 Mirza Balad Animation (Dubbing Manager)
 Teenage Ninja Ninja Turtles (2007) (Dubbing Director)
 Race (Movie 2019) (Dubbing Director and Character
(Menk)
 Enola Holmes (film)

Filmography 
 Siavash (2021)
 chesh mo gosh basteh film (2019)
  Safar e Sohrab
 Homa and sister
 divar be divar (2016)

Awards and nominations 
 Winning the statuette of the best male actor in the 34th Fajr Theater Festival for his performances in the plays "Darkness" and "Cold Fever on a Hot Forehead". (2015)
 Award for Best Actor at the 35th Fajr Theater Festival for his performances in "Oxygen" and "Phoenix Orphanage". (2016)

References

External links 
  
 

1975 births
Living people
People from Mashhad
People from Tehran
Iranian male film actors
Iranian male voice actors
Iranian male stage actors
Iranian male television actors
21st-century Iranian male actors